The International Kiteboarding Association (IKA), is the only kiteboarding class inside the International Sailing Federation (ISAF). The IKA class rules fall in the category of a development class.

History
The International Kiteboarding Association was founded in April 2008 by Guillaume Fournier (two-time kiteboarding world champion), after the International Sailing Federation (ISAF) had included the principle of surfers being propelled by a kite in the 'ISAF Equipment Rules of Sailing'.
Kiteboarding was adopted in November 2008 as an ISAF international sailing class.
An Executive Committee is re-appointed by the class AGM. The duties of the Executive Committee are to take care of the day-to-day business of the association, and to coordinate submissions from the sub-committees.

The Executive Committee is:
 Chairman: Richard Gowers (GBR)
 Vice-chairman: Bruno De Wannemaeker (BEL)
 Executive Secretary: Markus Schwendtner (GER)
 Board members: Mirco Babini (ITA), Olivier Mouragues (FRA), Adam Szymanski (POL) and John Gomes (USA).

Head of Communications and Public Affairs: Diego Massimiliano De Giorgi (ITA).

Disciplines
There are five disciplines with individual world rankings and world championships.

 Freestyle (where performance is judged on individual expression and difficulty of tricks)
 Course Racing (comparable to standard sailing regattas)
 Kite Cross (riders compete in heats against each other, with the winners advancing to the next round)
 Wave Riding (where performance is judged on wave selection and performance of manoeuvres on the wave)
 Speed (with performance measured by the average speed over a fixed distance, usually 500 m)

Classes
The IKA is responsible for the management of the following World Sailing kiteboarding classes:

 IKA Formula Kite – a high performance hydrofoiling class which has been selected by World Sailing as equipment for the kiteboarding event at the 2024 Summer Olympics.
 IKA KiteFoil
 IKA Open
 IKA TwinTip:Racing
 IKA TwinTip:Freestyle

Class growth
Around 30 national kite class associations are affiliated to the International Kiteboarding Association and active fleets exist in more than 65 countries.

Championships
Class Championships are run as 'one-off' competitions in the racing disciplines course racing, kite cross and speed, and as series of events for the expression disciplines freestyle and wave riding.

Tours
Professional Tour Operators exist that organize series of sanctioned events. These are:
 PKRA: Series of events in freestyle, course racing and wave riding
 KTE: European Freestyle Championship Series, also providing course racing events
 KTA: Asian Freestyle Championship Series, also offering disciplines like Old School and Twin Tip Racing
 KSP: Series of events in wave riding

Champions

Freestyle
 2021: Arthur Guillebert (FRA) & Mikaili Sol (BRA)
 2019: Valentin Rodriguez (COL) & Mikaili Sol (BRA)
 2018: Carlos Mario (BRA) & Mikaili Sol (BRA)
 2015: Liam Whaley (ES) & Gisela Pulido (ES)
 2014: Christophe Tack (BE) & Karolina Winkowska (POL)
 2013: Alex Pastor (ES) & Gisela Pulido (ES)
 2012: Youri Zoon (NED) & Karolina Winkowska (POL)
 2011: Youri Zoon (NED) & Gisela Pulido (ES)
 2010: Andy Yates (AUS) and Gisela Pulido (ES)
 2009: Kevin Langeree (NED) and Bruna Kayija (BRA)
 2008: Aaron Hadlow (UK) & Gisela Pulido (ES)
 2007: Aaron Hadlow (UK) & Gisela Pulido (ES)
 2006: Aaron Hadlow (UK)
 2005: Aaron Hadlow (UK)
 2005: Aaron Hadlow (UK)

Course racing
 2012: John Heineken(USA)and Erika Heineken (USA)
 2011: John Heineken (USA)and Steph Bridge (GBR)
 2010: Adam Koch (USA) and Kari Schibevaag (NOR)
 2009: Sean Farley (MEX) and Steph Bridge (GBR)

Speed
 2009 : Alexandre Caizergues (FRA) and Melissa Gil (PUE)

Wave riding
 2012: Keahi De Aboitiz (AUS) and Jalou Langeree (NED)
 2011: Airton Cozzolino (ITA) and Ines Correia (POR)
 2010: Guilly Brandao (BRA) and Gisela Pulido (ESP)
 2009: Jan Marcos Rivieras (DOM) and Kari Schibevaag (NOR)
 2008: Mitu Monteiro (CV)

Records
French kiteboarder Sebastien Cattelan  became the first sailor to break the 50 knots barrier by reaching 50.26  knots on  3 October 2008 at the Lüderitz Speed Challenge in Namibia.  Earlier in the event, on 19 September, American  Rob Douglas  reached 49.84 knots (92.30 km/h),  becoming the first kitesurfer to establish an outright world record in  speed sailing. Previously the record was held only by sailboats or  windsurfers.

The  outright sailing speed record has since been claimed by the French  trimaran Hydroptère  which, on 4 September 2009, reached a speed of 51.36 knots over 500  meters and 50.17 over a nautical mile in open ocean and only 25 to 30 knots of wind.

In October 2010, Rob Douglas became the outright speed world record holder on water powered by the wind with 55.65 knots, exceeding the previous record by more than four knots.

References

External links

National Class associations
 Associacion Argentina de Kite
 Austrian Kiteboarding Association
 Belgium Association of Boardriding Competitors
 Associaciao Brsileira de Kitesurf
 Croatian Kiteboarding Class Association
 Associacion Espaniola de Kitesurf
 Association Francais de la Classe Kite
 
 German Kiteboarding Association
 Hongkong Kiteboarding Federation 
 Kiteboarding Association of Moldavia
 Associacion Mexicana de Kitesurf 
 Polskie Stowarzyszenie Kiteboardingu
 Associacio Portuguesa de Kite

Manufacturers
 North Kiteboarding 
 Best Kiteboarding
 Cabrinha
 Naish Kiteboarding
 F-ONE

Kite
Kiteboarding
Sailing associations